A Chef in Love, (Georgian: შეყვარებული კულინარის 1001 რეცეპტი / Shekvarebuli kulinaris ataserti retsepti, literally, "1001 recipes of a chef in love") is a 1996 Georgian film directed by Nana Dzhordzhadze. It stars Pierre Richard and Nino Kirtadze.

Plot
The film tells the story of  Pascal Ichak, a French opera singer and chef living in Georgia, who opens a restaurant. It also shows the life in Georgia in the beginning of the 20th century, including its short period of independence (see Democratic Republic of Georgia). After the Bolshevik coup attempt of Georgia (1920), the chef refuses to emigrate and endures the brutalities of the new regime.

Awards
The film was selected as the Georgian entry for the Best Foreign Language Film at the 69th Academy Awards in 1997. A Chef in Love was among the final nominees for the award, but did not win.

See also
 List of submissions to the 69th Academy Awards for Best Foreign Language Film
 List of Georgian submissions for the Academy Award for Best Foreign Language Film

References

External links
 
 
 
  The New York Times movie review

1996 films
1990s romantic comedy-drama films
Comedy-drama films from Georgia (country)
Films directed by Nana Jorjadze
Films scored by Goran Bregović
Films set in Georgia (country)
Films set in the 1920s
1990s Georgian-language films
Romantic period films
Cooking films
1996 comedy films
1996 drama films